Ballagawne Halt (Manx: Stadd Valley Gawne) is a rural request stop on the Manx Electric Railway on the Isle of Man.

Location

Like several other halts on the line that run parallel with a main road between Douglas and Laxey on the coastal section above the nearby glen at Garwick.

Facilities

In recent years it has been equipped with a dual-purpose shelter that not only provides a waiting area for Bus Vannin customers, but also for the tramway passengers.  Its remote location ensure that it sees little use however and it remains another curio of this unique railway.

Also
Manx Electric Railway Stations

References

Sources
 Manx Manx Electric Railway Stopping Places (2002) Manx Electric Railway Society
 Island Island Images: Manx Electric Railway Pages (2003) Jon Wornham
 Official Tourist Department Page (2009) Isle Of Man Heritage Railways

Railway stations in the Isle of Man
Manx Electric Railway
Railway stations opened in 1894